Chiapas Fútbol Club Premier was a professional football team that played in the Mexican Football League. They played in the Segunda División de Mexico (Mexico's Second Division). Chiapas Fútbol Club Premier is affiliated with Chiapas F.C. who plays in the Liga MX. The games are held in the city of Tuxtla Gutiérrez in the Estadio Víctor Manuel Reyna.

Players

Current squad

References

Football clubs in Chiapas
Tuxtla Gutiérrez